Comes a Time is the ninth studio album by Canadian singer-songwriter Neil Young, released by Reprise Records in October 1978. Its songs are written as moralizing discourses on love's failures and recovering from worldly troubles. They are largely performed in a quiet folk and country mode, featuring backing harmonies sung by Nicolette Larson and additional accompaniment on some songs by Crazy Horse.

Production

The album originally started out as a solo record, but when Young played it for Reprise executives they asked him if he would consider adding rhythm tracks to what he already had. Young agreed, and the end product was Comes a Time.

Much of the album features harmony vocals from Nicolette Larson, who also shares lead vocals with Young on "Motorcycle Mama". Two songs on the album, "Look Out for My Love" and "Lotta Love", featured Young's long-time backing band, Crazy Horse. Another song, "Human Highway", was written several years prior to the album's release, and was originally recorded by Crosby, Stills, Nash & Young in 1974 for a proposed album to be called "Human Highway", but in typical CSNY fashion the recording sessions were abandoned amid acrimony between the four group members and the album never came to pass.

For many years it was rumoured that Young had personally purchased some 200,000 vinyl copies of Comes a Time having been unhappy with the album's sound, owing to damage that occurred to the master tape during shipment to the mixing facility. The version of the album most widely available today was personally remixed by Young from the safety copy of the original master. In a March 2014 interview with Rolling Stone, Young claimed that he, in fact, used the 200,000 LPs as shingles for a barn roof.

Critical reception 

Reviewing for The Village Voice in October 1978, Robert Christgau hailed Comes a Time as a "tour de force" for its folkie concept and music, with melodies that rival those of Young's After the Gold Rush (1970) and a sound that is "almost always quiet, usually acoustic and drumless, and sweetened by Nicolette Larson". While noting that listeners may "wonder why this thirty-two-year-old hasn't learned more about Long-Term Relationships", Christgau was ultimately won over by "the spare, good-natured assurance of the singing and playing" for how it "deepens the more egregious homilies and transforms good sense into wisdom". Stereo Review magazine's Noel Coppage found the album to be Young's "simplest, most acoustic, and best produced" record since 1972's Harvest, but more "down to earth and direct" in comparison and highlighted by a healthier perspective to his usual angst and varied songs performed in a consistent style. While lamenting a lack of energy to some degree, Coppage said that repeat listens of the album will provide "rewarding experiences with texture and mood, some real tunes, and the real personality Young puts into his work". Somewhat less impressed was Greil Marcus of Rolling Stone. Describing Comes a Time as "a restrained and modest set of love songs that traces a long affair from first light to final regrets", he expressed disappointment at the relative "facelessness" of the songwriting when compared with rougher music on earlier albums like Zuma (1975) and American Stars 'n Bars (1977).

At the end of 1978, Comes a Time was voted the year's eighth best album in the Pazz & Jop, an annual poll of American critics nationwide, published in The Village Voice. Christgau, the poll's supervisor, ranked it fifth on his own year-end list accompanying the poll.

According to Rolling Stones Milo Miles, while the album may have sounded out of place amidst the punk rock craze of 1978, it is in retrospect Young's "most timeless and easy-to-love works, a brief but immaculate" work. Miles interprets the opening track "Goin' Back" as Young returning to folk music in refuge from the real world, much as in the same way the album altogether offers listeners "a steady haven in dark times" with lyrics about "taking shelter from troubles and going out to face them again". AllMusic's William Ruhlmann recommended the album to fans of Harvest, saying "melodies, love lyrics, lush arrangements, and steel guitar solos dominated, and Young's vocals were made more accessible by being paired with Nicolette Larson's harmonies."

Track listing
All songs are written by Neil Young, except where noted. Track numbering and timings are from the original vinyl release, MSK 2266.

Personnel

Musicians

Neil Young – guitar, harmonica, vocals, production
Frank Sampedro – guitar, piano, vocals (on tracks 3 and 4)
Billy Talbot – bass, vocals (on tracks 3 and 4)
Ralph Molina – drums, vocals (on tracks 3 and 4)
Tim Mulligan – saxophone
Nicolette Larson – harmony / lead vocals (except on tracks 3 and 4)
Ben Keith – steel guitar
Karl Himmel – drums
Tim Drummond – bass
Spooner Oldham – piano
Rufus Thibodeaux – fiddle
Joe Osborn – bass
Larrie Londin – drums
J. J. Cale – electric guitar
Farrell Morris – percussion
Rita Fey – autoharp
Bucky Barrett, Grant Boatwright, Johnny Christopher, Jerry Shook, Vic Jordan, Steve Gibson, Dale Sellers, Ray Edenton – acoustic guitars
Shelly Kurland, Stephanie Woolf, Marvin Chantry, Roy Christensen, Gary Vanosdale, Carl Gorodetzky, George Binkley, Steven Smith, Larry Harvin, Larry Lasson, Carol Walker, Rebecca Lynch, Virginia Christensen, Maryanna Harvin, George Kosmola, Martha McCrory, Chuck Cochran – strings

Technical

Ben Keith – production (except on tracks 3, 4 and 8)
Tim Mulligan – production (except on track 7)
David Briggs – production (on tracks 3 and 4)
Tim Mulligan, Michael Laskow, David McKinley, Danny Hilley, Mike Porter, Denny Purcell, Rich "Hoss" Adler, Ernie Winfrey, Gabby Garcia, Paul Kaminsky – engineering
Elliot Roberts – direction
Tom Wilkes – art direction
Coley Coleman – photography

Charts

Weekly charts

Singles

Year End Chart

Certifications

References

External links
 Comes a Time at MySpace (streamed copy)

1978 albums
Neil Young albums
Albums produced by David Briggs (producer)
Reprise Records albums
Albums produced by Ben Keith
Albums produced by Neil Young
Albums recorded at Wally Heider Studios